A. Dawn H. Oliver  (born 1942) is a British constitutional legal scholar. She is Emeritus Professor of Constitutional Law at University College, London.

Biography
Oliver was born on 9 September 1942. She was Dean of the Faculty of Law at UCL from 1993 to 1998. She was elected as a fellow of the British Academy in 2005, and as an elected as an honorary Queen's Counsel in 2012.

Select publications
Oliver, D. 2013. "Parliament and the Courts: A Pragmatic Defence of Parliamentary Sovereignty", in Oliver, D., Drewry, G., Horne, A. (eds), The Law of Parliament. Oxford, Hart Publishing.
Oliver, D. and Fusaro, C., 2011. How Constitutions Change: A Comparative Study. Oxford, Hart Publishing.
Oliver, D. 2009. Justice, Legality, and the Rule of Law: Lessons from the Pitcairn Prosecutions. Oxford, Oxford University Press. 
Oliver, A.D. 2003. "Constitutional Reform in the UK". Oxford, Oxford University Press.

References

1942 births
Fellows of the British Academy
British women lawyers
21st-century King's Counsel
Living people
Women legal scholars
Academics of University College London